David Forde (born 5 July 1976 in Ogonnelloe, County Clare) is an Irish sportsperson. He plays hurling with his local club Ogonnelloe and was a member of the Clare senior inter-county team in the 1990s and 2000s.  He played as a forward.

References

1976 births
Living people
Ogonnelloe hurlers
Clare inter-county hurlers